Phos textus is a species of sea snail, a marine gastropod mollusk in the family Nassariidae, the true whelks.

Taxon inquirendum
 Phos textus var. rhodostoma E. von Martens, 1880

Description
The length of the shell attains 19.3 mm.

Distribution
This marine species occurs in the Mascarene Basin and off the Solomon Islands.

References

 Drivas, J. & M. Jay (1988). ''Coquillages de La Réunion et de l'île Maurice
 Fraussen K. & Poppe G.T. (2005) Revision of Phos and Antillophos (Buccinidae) from the Central Philippines. Visaya 1(5): 76-115.

External links
 Gmelin J.F. (1791). Vermes. In: Gmelin J.F. (Ed.) Caroli a Linnaei Systema Naturae per Regna Tria Naturae, Ed. 13. Tome 1(6). G.E. Beer, Lipsiae
 Quoy J.R.C. & Gaimard J.P. (1832-1835). Voyage de découvertes de l'"Astrolabe" exécuté par ordre du Roi, pendant les années 1826-1829, sous le commandement de M. J. Dumont d'Urville. Zoologie. 1: i-l, 1-264; 2(1): 1-321
 Reeve, L. A. (1841-1842). Conchologia Systematica, or complete system of conchology; in which the Lepades and conchiferous Mollusca are described and classified according to their natural organization and habits. Longman, Brown, Green, & Longman's, London.

Nassariidae
Gastropods described in 1791
Taxa named by Johann Friedrich Gmelin